The Nation with David Speers is an Australian television program on Sky News Australia. The program discusses political issues of the week with a panel of political contributors, moderated by host David Speers. The weekly program was one of two shows hosted by Speers, the other being the four-times weekly PM Agenda.

The program was filmed at Silk Studios in the Sydney suburb of Willoughby, where other select Sky News panel programs are filmed such as Richo + Jones and The Cabinet.

The program did not return in 2016, instead replaced by Speers Tonight.

References

External links
Sky News Official site

Sky News Australia
Australian non-fiction television series
English-language television shows
2010s Australian television series